Lawrence Markley was a college football player

College football
Markley played for the Sewanee Tigers of the Sewanee:The University of the South. He was captain of the 1908 team, and selected an All-Southern fullback both those years. Vanderbilt coach Dan McGugin wrote of Markley, "He has always been a very stubborn man on the defense, effective on a short plunge, and his cool head has helped to steady his team through many a crisis." At Sewanee he was a member of Sigma Alpha Epsilon.

References

American football fullbacks
Sewanee Tigers football players
All-Southern college football players